Johannes Sellin (born 31 December 1990) is a German handball player for MT Melsungen and the German national team.

Achievements
European Championship:
: 2016

References

1990 births
Living people
German male handball players
People from Wolgast
MT Melsungen players
Handball-Bundesliga players
Sportspeople from Mecklenburg-Western Pomerania